Uileacu may refer to several places in Romania:

 Uileacu de Beiuș is a commune in Bihor County 
 Uileacu Şimleului, a village in Măeriște commune, Sălaj County
 Uileacu de Criş, a village in Tileagd commune, Bihor County
 Uileacu de Munte, a village in Paleu commune, Bihor County